Tangará da Serra Airport , is the airport serving Tangará da Serra, Brazil.

Airlines and destinations

No scheduled flights operate at this airport.

Access

See also

List of airports in Brazil

References

External links

Airports in Mato Grosso